Angostura Recreation Area is a state recreation area in South Dakota on the eastern side of Angostura Reservoir in Fall River County. It was established in 1954, five years after the Angostura Dam created the reservoir. It is located approximately 10 miles south of Hot Springs.

The recreation area is administered by the South Dakota Department of Game, Fish, and Parks. It covers 1,125 acres and offers paved bike trails, campgrounds, beaches, and other activities. It provides reservoir access for boating, fishing and other water activities.

See also
List of South Dakota state parks

References

External links 
 https://gfp.sd.gov/state-parks/directory/angostura/

State parks of South Dakota
Fall River County, South Dakota
1954 establishments in South Dakota